The Fungus-growing termite, (Odontotermes feae), also known as South Asian wood-destroying termite, is a small species of earth dwelling termite of the genus Odontotermes. It is native to India and Sri Lanka.

Host plants
It attacks many dead wood and timber trees including,

Lagerstroemia parviflora
Anogeissus latifolia
Syzygium cumini
Schleichera oleosa
Lagerstroemia parviflora
Senna auriculata
Acorus calamus
Terminalia alata
Buchanania cochinchinensis

References

External links
Subterranian (sic) termite genus Odontotermes (Blattaria: Isoptera: Termitidae) from Chhattisgarh, India with its annotated checklist and revised key
Swarming behaviour of the termite Odontotermes feae (Termitidae : Macrotermitinae) in Dehra Dun (N.W. India) 1987
Total body lipid from different castes of termites, Odontoterme wallonensis and Odontotermes feae (Termitidae: Isoptera) 1982

Termites
Insects described in 1911
Insects of India